Clathrodrillia gibbosa is a species of sea snail, a marine gastropod mollusk in the family Drilliidae.

Description
The size of an adult shell varies between 20 mm and 60 mm. The shell is yellowish white or brownish, usually interruptedly broad-banded above and below the middle of the body whorl. The spire is turreted. The whorls are covered with a sutural cord and have a smooth, slightly concave shoulder The periphery is nodulous with the terminations of oblique, longitudinal ribs, which are crossed by strong revolving lines. The labium has a very strong projecting superior callus. The outer lip is winged, with a second small sinus indicated towards the base. The siphonal canal is short.

Distribution
This species occurs in the Caribbean Sea off Colombia, Venezuela and Suriname.

References

 Fallon P.J. (2016). Taxonomic review of tropical western Atlantic shallow water Drilliidae (Mollusca: Gastropoda: Conoidea) including descriptions of 100 new species. Zootaxa. 4090(1): 1–363

External links
 

gibbosa
Gastropods described in 1778